Houston is a forestry, mining and tourism town in the Bulkley Valley of the Northern Interior of British Columbia, Canada. Its urban population is approximately 3600 people, with approximately 2000 in the surrounding rural area. It is known as the "steelhead capital" and it has the world's largest fly fishing rod. Houston's tourism industry is largely based on ecotourism and Steelhead Park, situated along Highway 16. Houston is named in honour of the pioneer newspaperman John Houston.

History 

The Morice area was first charted by amateur historian, cartographer and geologist, Reverend Adrien-Gabriel Morice (1859-1938) known to northern British Columbian locals as "Father Morice." In 1880, Morice came to British Columbia as a Catholic missionary to the native people and was one of the first 'white men' to see most of the area. Morice wrote, The History of the Northern Interior of British Columbia (formerly New Caledonia) [1660 to 1880]. The Indigenous people were initially known as Carrier Indians, but today are more commonly referred to as the Wet'suwet'en (sometimes spelled Wit'suwit'en) and speak a language commonly referred to as Dakeł (Northern Athabaskan or Na-Dene language). The Morice River is called "Wet-zuhn-kwa" by the Wet'suwet'en people because of the bluish-green colour of the water.

Wet-zuhn-kwa produces fresh water species like rainbow trout, cutthroat trout, and Dolly Varden trout (bull trout). Pacific salmon species include Chinook salmon (spring or king salmon), sockeye salmon, pink salmon (humpies or humpbacks), coho salmon, and steelhead salmon, an anadromous form of the coastal rainbow trout.

The area is also rich in wildlife as it is not uncommon to spot moose, deer, black bear, grizzly bear, cougars and so on. Nanika River feeds Morice Lake and produces sockeye salmon. In the 1970s, the proposed Kemano Completion Project threatened to dam Nanika River. The project was eventually shelved. Morice River is a tributary of the Skeena river system, which is the second-largest system in BC that enters the Pacific Ocean at Prince Rupert.

In 1983, a huge forest-fire that started at Parrot Lakes threatened the community of Houston. A campfire being used by two tourists from Switzerland got out of control. The fire became known as the "Swiss Fire" and burned notable landmarks like Rose Ranch and Morice Mountain. In the post World War II era, many settlers in the region between Prince George and Prince Rupert arrived as a result of the Frontier Apostle movement.

Demographics 

Religion 
According to the 2021 census, religious groups in Houston included:
Irreligion (1,685 persons or 55.9%)
Christianity (1,230 persons or 40.8%)
Sikhism (45 persons or 1.5%)
Hinduism (25 persons or 0.8%)
Buddhism (15 persons or 0.5%)
Other (10 persons or 0.3%)

Transportation 
Via Rail's Jasper–Prince Rupert train calls at the Houston railway station several times per week. Houston can be reached by the Trans-Canada Highway, which enters the community as Highway 16, part of the Yellowhead Highway. The aerodrome has no scheduled service.

Politics 
Houston is located in the federal electoral district of Skeena-Bulkley Valley, which has been held since 2004 by incumbent Nathan Cullen of the New Democratic Party of Canada. In the 2008 general federal election, Houston Mayor Sharon Smith ran as a Conservative Party candidate where she was defeated. She was also defeated a month later in the mayoral municipal election.

Provincially Houston is located in the new Nechako Lakes electoral district as of the general election of 2009 the elected MLA was John Rustad of the British Columbia Liberal Party. Previously the Bulkley Valley-Stikine electoral district was held by Dennis MacKay, also of the British Columbia Liberal Party.

Geography 
West of Houston are Telkwa, Smithers, Witset, Old Hazelton, New Hazelton, Terrace, and Prince Rupert. East of Houston are Topley, Granisle, Burns Lake, Fraser Lake, and Prince George.

Buck Creek also joins the Bulkley River near the community by the local mall. Historically, Buck Creek formed a delta where most of the downtown is located. The delta was channelled and dyked which probably led to the downfall and destruction of important, rearing habitat of young salmon produced in that stream.

The area is in a rain shadow of the Coast Mountains, however due to being dominated by a low pressure region, Houston receives a mid-range volume of precipitation annually.

Nestled into the Coast Mountains, many Houstonites use this area for recreational camping and fishing.

The Bulkley, a small stream running through Houston, and the Morice River join just west of Houston. At the point of their joining they become the Bulkley River, not the Morice despite the fact the Morice is larger. This was done by Poudrier, a government cartographer who, it is rumoured, never saw the region. The Bulkley is named for American engineer, Colonel Charles S. Bulkley, one of the surveyors constructing the Russian–American Telegraph line through the Pleasant Valley. This was in the late 1800s.

Nearby communities:

Barrett
Buck Flats
Burns Lake
Decker Lake
Duncan Lake (Broman Lake)
Endako
Forestdale
Fort Babine
Fort Fraser
François Lake
Fraser Lake
Granisle
Grassy Plains
Noralee
Old Fort
Palling
Perow
Quick
Rose Lake
Round Lake
Smithers
Southbank
Telkwa
Topley
Topley Landing
Walcott
Witset (formerly Moricetown)

Climate
Houston has a humid continental climate (Köppen Dfb) with mild summers and cold winters. Being in a rain shadow of the coastal mountains, Houston has a quite dry climate with relatively uniform precipitation year-round. Annual snowfall is still quite high due to the five-month period with means below freezing.

Recreation 
The Houston Hikers' Society provides website where trail information, maps, photos and driving directions can be accessed. The Morice Mountain Nordic Ski Club is a volunteer non-profit society. The MMNSC is responsible for all developments and trail grooming as well as maintenance of the facilities, and for trail users' fee collections.

Many locals frequent the Nanika-Kidprice Lakes Basin canoe route. This basin lies on the eastern slope of the Coastal Mountain Range and forms the upper watershed of the Morice-Bulkley rivers. The  route takes about three or four days to complete.

The recently constructed Houston Leisure Facility holds a pool, hot-tub, sauna and fitness gym. Houston has a nine-hole golf course. Jamie Baxter Park was named after a boy that disappeared in the forest while playing in the Buck Flats area in the late 1970s. It was fall-time and temperatures at night dipped below  and the boy eventually lost his life.

Schools 

Houston is located in School District 54 Bulkley Valley and has three public schools and one privately run Christian denominational school.

Elementary schools:
Silverthorne Elementary School
Twain Sullivan Elementary School
Secondary schools:
Houston Secondary School

The Houston Christian School teaches from K-12.

References 

Smith, Elnora. C. (1971). Marks On The Forest Floor - A Story Of Houston, British Columbia. Houston British Columbia: Houston Centennial '71 Committee.
Hinzmann, Christine. Frontier Apostolate marks 60th anniversary, Prince George Citizen, August 18, 2016 
North Coast Review, Frontier Apostles the focus of Vancouver Sun article (2012)
The Kerryman, Frontier Apostle who loved travel and literature

External links 

District municipalities in British Columbia
Populated places in the Regional District of Bulkley-Nechako
Bulkley Valley